Al Messila is a district in Qatar, located in the municipality of Doha. For the most part, large gated compounds and schools occupy this district. It shares its western border with Lebday and Old Al Rayyan in Al Rayyan Municipality.

Geography
Al Messila borders the following districts:
New Al Hitmi and Fereej Bin Omran to the east, separated by Jassim Bin Hamad Street.
Madinat Khalifa South to the north, separated by Al Jazira Al Arabiya Street.
Lebday and Old Al Rayyan to the west, separated by 22 February Street.
Al Sadd to the south, separated by Al Rayyan Road.

Landmarks
Al Mesilla Compound on Al Rayyan Road.
Al Rayyan Village on Jassim Bin Hamad Street.
QIC Gardens on Al Murour Street.
Granada Souq on Al Jazira Al Arabiya Street.

Transport
Major roads that run through the district are Al Jazira Al Arabiya Street, Jassim Bin Hamad Street, 22 February Street, and Al Rayyan Road.

The underground Al Messila station currently serves the Green Line of the Doha Metro. The station was opened to the public on 10 December, 2019 along with the other Green Line stations. It is located in Al Sadd on Al Rayyan Road, opposite of Al Sadd's boundary with Al Messila.

Demographics

As of the 2010 census, the district comprised 973 housing units and 119 establishments. There were 4,716 people living in the district, of which 56% were male and 44% were female. Out of the 4,716 inhabitants, 70% were 20 years of age or older and 30% were under the age of 20. The literacy rate stood at 98%.

Employed persons made up 55% of the total population. Females accounted for 31% of the working population, while males accounted for 69% of the working population.

Education
The following schools are located in Al Messila:

References

Communities in Doha